If These Trees Could Talk is an instrumental post-rock band from Akron, Ohio. The band self-released their self-titled debut EP in 2006. Independent record label The Mylene Sheath re-released the EP on vinyl in 2007, and went on to release the band's debut studio album, Above the Earth, Below the Sky, on vinyl also, in 2009. The band self-released their second album Red Forest in March 2012, whilst the album's vinyl release went through Science of Silence Records. They went on to follow up the release of "Red Forest" with a self-promoted tour throughout Europe in April 2012. The band released its third album, The Bones of a Dying World, in June, 2016 on Metal Blade Records. The band's releases were re-issued in 2021 and 2022 on Metal Blade Records.

Mike Socrates has also been releasing music with side projects Artificial Astronaut and Brave Arrows.

Members
 Tom Fihe – bass guitar
 Jeff Kalal – guitar
 Cody Kelly – guitar
 Mike Socrates – guitar
 Zack Kelly – drums

Discography
Studio albums
 Above the Earth, Below the Sky (2009)
 Red Forest (2012)
 The Bones of a Dying World (2016)

EPs
 If These Trees Could Talk (2006)

References

External links

American post-rock groups
Musical groups from Akron, Ohio
Musical quartets
Musical groups established in 2000
American post-metal musical groups